Anne Golden  (born 1941) is a Canadian administrator.

She received her BA in history from University College, University of Toronto, in 1962. She received an MA from Columbia University and a PhD in American history from the University of Toronto.

She joined the United Way of Greater Toronto, Canada's largest annual fundraising campaign and non-governmental distributor of funds to the social services, in 1982 and was its President from 1987 to 2001. From 2001 until 2012, she was the President and CEO of The Conference Board of Canada. In April 2012 she was named Distinguished Visiting Scholar and Special Advisor at Ryerson University

She was Chairman of the Greater Toronto Area Task Force for Ontario in 1996. In 1998, Mel Lastman, the Mayor of Toronto, appointed her chair of the Toronto Homelessness Action Task Force.

She was director of research for the Ontario Liberal Party and special advisor to the Leader of the Opposition. She taught at Newark College of Engineering, the University of Toronto, and York University.

In 2003, she was made a Member of the Order of Canada. She has received five honorary doctorates, from McMaster University (2011), the University of Calgary (2011), University of Toronto (2002), York University (2000) and Ryerson Polytechnic University (1997). The Conference Board named Anne Golden its 2012 Honorary Associate. In 2013, she was made a Member of the Order of Ontario

One of Golden's sisters is National Post columnist Barbara Kay.

References

1941 births
Living people
Members of the Order of Canada
Members of the Order of Ontario
Columbia University alumni
New Jersey Institute of Technology faculty
University of Toronto alumni